The Complete Monument & Columbia Album Collection is a box set by country singer/songwriter Kris Kristofferson, released in 2016 on Columbia Records and Legacy Recordings.

The set consists of 16 CDs, the majority of which are reissues of albums released by Kristofferson during his 1970-1984 tenure with Monument Records. Included are all of his 10 studio albums from the period, plus a duet album by Kristofferson and Rita Coolidge. Each CD is packaged in a replica of the original LP cover, with any albums originally issued as two-LP set condensed onto one disc. Additional content consists of three live records (two of them previously unreleased), demos and a bonus disc called 'Extras', compiling non-album tracks and duets taken from other albums. For example, every Kristofferson song from The Winning Hand and Music from Songwriter list included there.

The CD set also includes a booklet featuring newly written essays and liner notes by Fred Foster, Don Was and Mikal Gilmore.

Alongside the CD version, digital download versions of the content were published (all songs/albums individually as well as the complete set containing all 16 albums).

Album list
Kristofferson (1970)
The Silver Tongued Devil and I (1971)
Border Lord (1972)
Jesus Was a Capricorn (1972)
Spooky Lady's Sideshow (1974)
Breakaway - Kris Kristofferon & Rita Coolidge (1974)
Who's to Bless and Who's to Blame (1975)
Surreal Thing (1976)
Easter Island (1978)
Shake Hands with the Devil (1979)
To the Bone (1981)
Live At The Big Sur Folk Festival (recorded 1970, previously unreleased)
The WPLJ-FM Broadcast (recorded 1972, previously unreleased)
Live at the Philharmonic (recorded 1972/released 1992)
Extras (previously released non-LP singles, outtakes and appearances)
Demos (previously unreleased)

Track listing
Track listings from the previously unreleased CDs.

References

2016 compilation albums
Columbia Records compilation albums
Kris Kristofferson albums